Lakshmipur Sukhchaina . is a village development committee in Sarlahi District in the Janakpur Zone of south-eastern Nepal. At the time of the 1991 Nepal census it had a population of 4,806. Now according to the census of Nepal 2011 it has the population of 5,760 spread over 888 households.

References

External links
UN map of the municipalities of Sarlahi  District

Populated places in Sarlahi District